The men's ISSF 25 meter rapid fire pistol was a shooting sports event held as part of the Shooting at the 1984 Summer Olympics programme. The competition was held on August 1 and 2 at the shooting ranges in Los Angeles. 55 shooters from 31 nations competed. Nations had been limited to two shooters each since the 1952 Games. The event was won by Takeo Kamachi of Japan, the nation's first rapid fire pistol medal. Defending champion Corneliu Ion of Romania took silver, the seventh man to win multiple medals in the event. Finland's Rauno Bies earned bronze, the first medal for a Finn in the rapid fire pistol since 1964.

Background

This was the 17th appearance of what had been standardised in 1948 as the men's ISSF 25 meter rapid fire pistol event, the only event on the 2020 programme that traces back to 1896. The event has been held at every Summer Olympics except 1904 and 1928 (when no shooting events were held) and 1908; it was nominally open to women from 1968 to 1980, although very few women participated these years. There is no women's equivalent on the Olympic programme, as of 2021. The first five events were quite different, with some level of consistency finally beginning with the 1932 event—which, though it had differences from the 1924 competition, was roughly similar. The 1936 competition followed the 1932 one quite closely. The post-World War II event substantially altered the competition once again. The 1984 Games introduced women's-only shooting events, including the ISSF 25 meter pistol (though this was more similar to the non-Olympic men's ISSF 25 meter center-fire pistol than the rapid fire pistol).

Three of the top 10 shooters from 1980 returned: gold medalist Corneliu Ion of Romania, bronze medalist Gerhard Petritsch of Austria, and seventh-place finisher Marin Stan of Romania. Japan's Takeo Kamachi, who had competed in 1968, 1972, and 1976 but never finished in the top 10, also returned. Reigning (1982) world champion Igor Puzirev of the Soviet Union did not compete due to the Soviet-led boycott, but runner-up Ove Gunnarsson of Sweden and third-place finisher Alfred Radke of West Germany were present.

Bahrain, the People's Republic of China, Ecuador, Oman, Paraguay, Qatar, Saudi Arabia, and Senegal each made their debut in the event. The United States made its 14th appearance, most of any nation.

Competition format

The competition format followed the 1948 format, now very close to the modern rapid fire pistol competition after significant variation before World War II. Each shooter fired 60 shots. These were done in two courses of 30; each course consisted of two stages of 15; each stage consisted of three series of 5. In each stage, the time limit for each series was 8 seconds for the first, 6 seconds for the second, and 4 seconds for the third. Ties for medals were broken via shoot-off, with each shoot-off round consisting of 3 series of 5 shots.

A holdover from the previous Games was that silhouettes, rather than round targets, continued to be used; however, scoring rings had been added so that now each shot was scored up to 10 rather than being strictly hit or miss.

One change from 1948–1956 was that hits were no longer the primary measurement of success. As in 1960–1980, ranking was done by score, regardless of hits.

Records

Prior to the competition, the existing world and Olympic records were as follows.

No new world or Olympic records were set during the competition.

Schedule

Results

References

Shooting at the 1984 Summer Olympics
Men's 1984
Men's events at the 1984 Summer Olympics